The 1987 North Indian Ocean cyclone season was part of the annual cycle of tropical cyclone formation. The season has no official bounds but cyclones tend to form between April and December. These dates conventionally delimit the period of each year when most tropical cyclones form in the northern Indian Ocean. There are two main seas in the North Indian Ocean—the Bay of Bengal to the east of the Indian subcontinent and the Arabian Sea to the west of India. The official Regional Specialized Meteorological Centre in this basin is the India Meteorological Department (IMD), while the Joint Typhoon Warning Center (JTWC) releases unofficial advisories. An average of five tropical cyclones form in the North Indian Ocean every season with peaks in May and November. Cyclones occurring between the meridians 45°E and 100°E are included in the season by the IMD.

Prior to 1992, this season had the most tropical storms in North Indian recorded history, with 8 storms forming.

Systems

Tropical Storm One (1B)

Tropical Storm One, which developed in the central Bay of Bengal on January 30, turned to the north and reached a peak of 65 mph winds on the 2nd. Vertical shear weakened it to a tropical depression before it hit northern Myanmar on the 4th.

Tropical Storm Two (2B)

On June 4 65 mph Tropical Storm Two hit Bangladesh, causing little damage or loss of life.

Tropical Storm Three (3A)

The monsoon trough spawned a tropical depression on June 4 in the Arabian Sea. It tracked due eastward, becoming a tropical storm later that day and reaching a peak of 60 mph winds on the 6th. The storm turned abruptly northward, turned westward and executed an anticyclonic loop. Vertical shear caused the system to dissipate on the 12th.

Tropical Storm Four (4B)

A monsoon depression became more tropical on October 14 in the Bay of Bengal. It traveled northwestward, becoming a tropical storm on the 15th and hitting southeastern India as a 50 mph storm that night. It rapidly dissipated over land.

Tropical Storm Five (5B)

65 mph Tropical Storm Five, which developed on October 30 in the Bay of Bengal, made landfall at Nellore on the 2nd, dissipating shortly thereafter. 50 people and 26,000 cattle were reported to be died and 7 lakh people were affected due to the storm.

Tropical Storm Six (6B)

The monsoon trough spawned a tropical depression on November 8 in the southeastern Bay of Bengal. It tracked northward, then turned westward, strengthening to a 60 mph tropical storm before hitting eastern India on the 12th.

Tropical Storm Seven (7A)

Tropical Storm Seven, which developed in the western Bay of Bengal on December 2, strengthened in the eastern Arabian Sea to a 50 mph storm. It turned to the northeast, where upper-level winds weakened it to a tropical depression. The depression hit western India, 90 miles south of Bombay, on the 12th, and dissipated the next day without causing any damage.

Tropical Storm Eight (8B)

The eighth and final storm of the season formed on December 17 northeast of Sri Lanka. It moved westward, and executed an elongated loop lasting 4 days. It briefly reached tropical storm strength before vertical shear weakened it again, and the system hit eastern India on the 23rd.

See also

North Indian Ocean tropical cyclone
1987 Atlantic hurricane season
1987 Pacific hurricane season
1987 Pacific typhoon season
Australian cyclone seasons: 1986–87, 1987–88
South Pacific cyclone seasons: 1986–87, 1987–88
South-West Indian Ocean cyclone seasons: 1986–87, 1987–88

References

External links
India Meteorological Department
Joint Typhoon Warning Center 

 
1987 NIO